The 1982 winners of the Torneo di Viareggio (in English, the Viareggio Tournament, officially the Viareggio Cup World Football Tournament Coppa Carnevale), the annual youth football tournament held in Viareggio, Tuscany, are listed below.

Format
The 16 teams are seeded in 4 groups. Each team from a group meets the others in a single tie. The winner of each group progress to the final knockout stage.

Participating teams
Italian teams

  Ascoli
  Avellino
  Catanzaro
  Fiorentina
  Inter Milan
  Juventus
  Milan
  Napoli
  Perugia
  Roma

European teams

  Ipswich Town
  Dukla Praha
  Hajduk Split
  Rijeka
  Feyenoord

American teams
  Mexico City

Group stage

Group A

Group B

Group C

Group D

Knockout stage

Champions

Footnotes

External links
 Official Site (Italian)
 Results on RSSSF.com

1980
1981–82 in Italian football
1981–82 in Yugoslav football
1981–82 in Czechoslovak football
1981–82 in English football
1981–82 in Mexican football
1981–82 in Dutch football